Rockland Records was an American record label founded by R&B recording artist and record producer R. Kelly in 1998, having distribution from Interscope Records. The label was home to recording artists such as Kelly himself, Sparkle, Boo & Gotti among others. The label has released four albums  certified platinum by the Recording Industry Association of America (RIAA). The label is known for songs like "Fiesta (Remix)", "Fortunate", "Be Careful" and "What Would You Do?". Rockland Records main producers are R. Kelly and Trackmasters. The label is currently inactive but Kelly still owns the Rockland Records imprint.

History
Kelly founded Rockland Records in 1998, in conjunction with Universal Music Group, shortly before releasing his fourth album (R.).
Rockland's artists included Sparkle, rappers Boo & Gotti, Talent, and Vegas Cats (the latter two groups never released an album) among others. The soundtrack to the 1999 Martin Lawrence and Eddie Murphy movie Life was released on the Rockland label, and Sparkle was the first artist to release an album on the label. Despite various conflicts between Sparkle and the label, her debut album performed well, going platinum. The album's most popular track was a duet between Kelly and Sparkle titled "Be Careful".

The label's roster included artists Sparkle, Boo & Gotti, Talent, Vegas Cats, Lady, Frankie and Secret Weapon, and Rebecca F.

On October 13, 1998, a posthumous single by 2Pac was released featuring label group mate "Talent", the song was Changes and is now known as one of the greatest rap songs of all time. Talent later released their own single called "Celebrity" from their album "Bulls Eye", which was a minor hit, peaking at number 90 on the R&B/Hip Hop chart.

In 1998, the label's first artist, Sparkle released her debut self-titled album, Sparkle. In addition to producing and writing the project, Kelly made vocal contribution to the hit duet "Be Careful," which contributed largely to the album's success. The album was certified platinum in December 2000. In 1999, Kelly wrote and produced the soundtrack to the Martin Lawrence and Eddie Murphy movie Life, which features tracks from K-Ci & JoJo, Maxwell, Mýa, and Destiny's Child. The soundtrack was released on the Rockland label. Rockland artists Sparkle, Talent, and Vegas Cats all appeared on the Life soundtrack.

Sparkle was dropped from the label for refusing to show up to work unless her boyfriend, Steve Huff, was allowed to work on her next project. In addition, she was released several times for insubordination.

Later, Sparkle was released for good and she went to Motown to record the album Told You So. The album's only minor hit was "It's A Fact" which reached #62 on the R&B charts. Sparkle tried to team up with Kelly once more but was unable, due to past issues. After Kelly refused to work with Sparkle, she claimed her niece was in a sex tape having sex with R. Kelly, which Kelly, the girl, and her parents all denied.

Boo & Gotti and Vegas Cats appeared on R. Kelly's albums, R. and TP-2.com, as well as a freestyle from Boo & Gotti on The Fast and the Furious soundtrack, making several references to Rockland. Production duo Trackmasters (also known as Poke & Tone) were a part of the label at that time, producing many of the songs from Rockland Records.

In 2001, R. Kelly shelved the label and focused on producing and writing songs for other artists. The label is currently inactive but Kelly still owns the Rockland Records imprint, the last time an album was released from the label was in 2004, with the second Jay-Z & R. Kelly collaboration album, Unfinished Business.

Artists

Former acts

Discography

See also
 List of record labels

References

R. Kelly
Record labels established in 1998
American record labels
Music production companies
Defunct record labels of the United States
Vanity record labels
Contemporary R&B record labels
Interscope Records